Hey Gorgeous (previously styled Hey! Gorgeous) is a Singaporean talent-scouting competition which searches for new talents in tertiary institutes. The show ran for three seasons, with a change in its Chinese title during the second season. A similar contest was held in 2009, although it was not broadcast on television.

History
Hey Gorgeous was preceded by a talent-scouting competition entitled School Belle and the Beau (流星花园), which only aired on MediaCorp Channel 8 for one season in 2004. This season was hosted by Dennis Chew and Belinda Lee, and spawned artists such as Elvin Ng to fame. It took its current name when it was broadcast on MediaCorp Channel U in 2007. Two years later, a similar competition, entitled Hey Gorgeous Online (校花校草上网追赶跑), was carried out in a wider variety of schools, and was hosted by YES 933 DJs. Public voting was carried out through voting online at the Hey Gorgeous website.

After a four-year hiatus, there is a slight change to the format, as well as its Chinese name. The second season launched artistes like Carrie Wong, Somaline Ang & Richie Koh & to fame and the third season launched artistes like He Yingying to fame.

Judges and hosts
Dasmond Koh and Ben Yeo serve as the hosts for all seasons. Fiona Xie was one of the main hosts for the first season, but did not appear in subsequent seasons after leaving MediaCorp. During the second season, other artists such as Shane Pow and Romeo Tan join them during the campus searches. In the third season, Vivian Lai and Kate Pang joined as main hosts.

During the finals of the second season, Dai Xiangyu, Rebecca Lim and Zhang Zhenhuan formed the judging panel.

Sheila Sim, Xu Bin and Kym Ng served as judges during the semifinals of the third season.

Format
In all seasons, the first few episodes involve a campus search in which the hosts travel to various tertiary institutions and look out for good-looking students. In the first season, contestants were grouped according to their genders and schools, and they had to put up performances.

Since season 2, the contestants are to participate in certain games in order to win points. Contestants are awarded based on their overall performances, and the top few from each school would then move on to the semi-finals. The semi-finalists would then undergo a bootcamp where they try out outdoor activities, where they would be judged by special local artistes. During the finals, the finalists have to show their EQ, fashion sense, and wit, and would by judged by public votes.

Criticism 
The second season was criticised to have bent ethics by having a lecturer divulging her students' particulars and administrative headshots to the hosts, as well as having the lecturer making calls to her student to be on the show.

Series overview

References

Singaporean reality television series
2007 Singaporean television series debuts
Channel U (Singapore) original programming
Channel 8 (Singapore) original programming